Posht Qaleh or Poshtqaleh may refer to:

Posht Qaleh, Gilan
Posht Qaleh, Ilam
Posht Qaleh, Faryab, Kerman Province
Poshtqaleh, Bam, Kerman Province
Posht Qaleh, Lorestan